The March 2019 North American blizzard was a powerful Colorado Low that produced up to two feet of snow in the plains and Midwest. Rapid snowmelt following the storm caused historic flooding, and some areas received hurricane-force wind gusts. The severe storm set new all-time record low barometric pressure readings in Colorado, Kansas and New Mexico. The storm itself killed only one person in Colorado, but flooding caused by the storm killed at least 3, one in Iowa and at least two in Nebraska and left ~140,000 without power in Texas.

Meteorological history
The system originated from an extratropical low that developed in the Gulf of Alaska on March 8. Over the next two days, the system moved southeastward, bringing rainy and windy conditions to California on March 11, and the system was named "Winter Storm Ulmer" by The Weather Channel later that day, due to the storm's expected impacts. Early on March 12, the system moved onshore in Southern California, subsequently developing into a strong Colorado Low over the Southwestern United States. The storm's tight pressure gradient allowed wind gusts in excess of 100 mph to develop in the Texas Panhandle. As the storm headed northward towards the Great Lakes, blizzard conditions were reported in several States, from Colorado all the way north into North Dakota and flooding hit the southern portions of those states. The storm also began weakening.

Impacts

United States
At least 1 million acres of U.S. farmland, in nine major grain producing states, were flooded after the storm.

Alabama
Severe weather damage was widespread throughout the state, mainly from the 13 tornadoes that touched down on March 14. The strongest was an EF2 tornado, that passed north Holtville and continued to just southwest of Weoka, destroying or damaging outbuildings, homes, convenience stores, power poles, and trees along its path. A car was also moved . In Fayette,  was reported while damaging winds knocked down numerous trees and power lines.

Colorado
The storm underwent explosive cyclogenesis as it tracked across the Southern Rocky Mountains. The storm brought wind gusts that exceeded Category 2 hurricane strength with gusts reaching  recorded at Peterson Air Force Base and a  gust recorded in Glen Haven. The combination of high winds and snowy conditions forced the cancellation of all flights in and out of Denver International Airport most of the day March 13 and a third of the flights scheduled for March 14th. Numerous vehicular accidents were reported with at least 1,000 people stranded on the highways, requiring rescue by the National Guard and emergency services providers. A Colorado State Patrol officer was killed by one driver who lost control of his vehicle on Interstate 76 northeast of Denver.

Iowa
Iowa was also affected by heavy rains and flooding, closing parts of all nine state parks. Iowa Governor Kim Reynolds signed an emergency disaster proclamation March 14th. One man was killed in Iowa. Flooding across Iowa was described as "catastrophic" especially in the Missouri River Valley south of Council Bluffs, Iowa. There, at least 30 levee failures flooded towns and highways. Interstate 29 was closed from Council Bluffs to the Missouri state border and from there to St. Joseph, Missouri, with portions of the interstate under  of water.

Kentucky
The state was affected by severe thunderstorms that produced several tornadoes. Most notably, an EF2 tornado spotted near West Paducah, strong enough to rip part of the roof off of the Mount Zion church.

Kansas
Meteorologists were forecasting a record low barometric pressure reading as the storm passed over Kansas. Dodge City, Kansas reported a new record low pressure.

Michigan
Upwards of 70 buildings in Vernon were damaged by an EF2 tornado late on March 14. Strong winds and flooding also affected the state.

Nebraska

Western Nebraska experienced severe wind gusts and more than a foot of snow in some localities. In the eastern half of the state, rapidly melting snows along with frozen rivers caused record setting flooding in many rivers and streams. On the Niobrara River, the Spencer Dam collapsed and the unregulated flooding destroyed 3 bridges downstream including the Highway 281 bridge. In east central Nebraska, residents along the flooded Missouri, Platte and Elkhorn Rivers were forced to evacuate as some locals experienced all-time record flooding. The city of Norfolk, Nebraska evacuated a third of its residents. The Platte and Elkhorn Rivers had overflowed their levees in the greater Omaha, Nebraska region and some communities were put under a mandatory evacuation order. By March 15, access to the city of Fremont was blocked due to all roads being closed in and out of the city. This remained the case days later with national guard military convoys being set up to get food and other supplies into the city. As of March 18, 2 persons were reported to have drowned in Nebraska and 2 more are missing and presumed dead. On March 18, Nebraska governor Pete Ricketts stated that the floods caused "the most extensive damage our state has ever experienced." Losses from flooding in Nebraska alone exceeds $1.3 Billion, including $449 million in infrastructure damage, $440 million of crop damage, $400 million of lost cattle. More than 2,000 homes and 340 businesses were damaged or destroyed, costing the state another $85 million.

In the central parts of Nebraska, large ice slabs were reported to have destroyed crops, and Sub-Zero conditions often hurt livestock. An additional round of Flooding is said to have wiped out some farms for years.

New Mexico
In addition, powerful thunderstorms moving through the state spawned several tornadoes, damaging many homes.

Oklahoma
A high wind warning was issued by the National Weather Service as thunderstorms with 50 mph (80 km/h) wind gusts downed power lines, tree branches, some fences, and caused other kinds of minor wind damage across Oklahoma City and its suburbs.

South Dakota
The City of Pierre achieved full on blizzard conditions (frequent wind gusts above 35 mph/56 km/h producing visibility lower than 1/4 mile/400 metres for at least 3 hours). These conditions prompted the closure of the I-90 from Wall to Chamberlain. 18.3 inches (46 cm) of snow fell in Kadoka and winds gusted to 70 mph (112 km/h) in Rapid City.

Texas
At San Augustin Pass and at Pine Springs, Texas wind gusts of  respectively were recorded. At Grand Prairie's municipal airport, a wind gust of 109 mph (175 km/h) tore through, flipping several small airplanes. Winds were great enough in the Texas panhandle to blow over numerous tractor-trailers.

Wyoming
Blizzard conditions were reported for all of eastern Wyoming, especially in the southeastern sections of the state from Casper to the state capital in Cheyenne. Both Interstate 25 and 80 were closed through most of the state.

An additional snow squall moved across Southeast Wyoming Friday through Sunday, adding 1-2 inches of snow. Due to the location of the low, many areas were above freezing and had rain instead, which prompted the NWS to issue Flood watches and warnings in the area.

Canada

Atlantic Canada
The storm brought above seasonal temperatures to much of Atlantic Canada,  along with soaking rains. Although, Labrador was affected by heavy snow with up to 30 cm (1 foot) of snow in some areas. Afterwards, the storm moved out to sea.

Ontario and Quebec
The provinces experienced their warmest day in weeks, sparking the risk for isolated severe thunderstorms in extreme southwestern Ontario. These storms triggered flooding along the Humber River, resulting in an evacuation order for 200 people. Behind the storm's cold front, cold, below seasonal temperatures returned along with snowsqualls in the snow belts. Meanwhile, Northern Ontario was hit with heavy snow and strong winds, producing blizzard-like conditions.

Tornado outbreak

March 12 event

March 13 event

March 14 event

See also 

 Bomb cyclone
 1993 Storm of the Century – An extremely powerful extratropical cyclone that brought blizzard conditions to extensive portions of the Eastern U.S. in March 1993
 March 2014 North American winter storm
 April 2019 North American blizzard

Notes

References 

2019 natural disasters in the United States
2018–19 North American winter
Blizzards in the United States
2019 in Kansas
2019 in Nebraska
2019 in South Dakota
2019 in Wyoming
March 2019 events in North America